Miss Universe 1972, the 21st Miss Universe pageant, was held on 29 July, 1972 at the Cerromar Beach Hotel in Dorado, Puerto Rico. Kerry Anne Wells earned Australia's first Miss Universe crown. Georgina Rizk of Lebanon, was not allowed to crown her successor due to government restrictions because of fears of a terrorist attack. Lebanon did not compete in 1972 and Georgina could not be there to crown Miss Universe 1972. Wells was crowned by Miss Universe 1970, Marisol Malaret of Puerto Rico and Miss Universe 1971 1st Runner-Up Toni Rayward.
It was the first edition to be held outside the continental United States.

Results

Placements

Special Awards 

Order Of Announcements

Top 12

 
Top 5

Contestants

Notes

Debuts

Withdrawals/Did not complete
  - No contest held.
  - Damayanthi Gunewardena completed at Miss International 1972
  - Maria Koutrouza
  - Roya Rouhani Moghaddam
  - Christiane Accaoui did not participate in Miss Universe as scheduled due to the instability of the Middle East following the terrorist attacks.
  - Connie Ann Ballantyne Sequeira comepleted at Miss International 1972
  - No contest held.
  - Moea Arapari completed at Miss International 1972
  - Elicia Irish
  - Souad Keneari did not participate in Miss Universe as scheduled due to the instability of the Middle East following the terrorist attacks.
  - Daniela Krajcinovic felt ill before arrive.

Name Changes

Awards
  - Miss Amity (Ombayi Mukuta)
  - Miss Photogenic (Anne-Marie Roger)
  - Best National Costume (Carmen Ampuero)

General References

External links
 Miss Universe official website

1972
1972 in Puerto Rico
1972 beauty pageants
Beauty pageants in Puerto Rico
Dorado, Puerto Rico
July 1972 events in North America